Pancho Villa is a 1972 American, British and Spanish spaghetti western film directed by Eugenio Martín. It takes as its starting point the life and legend of the Mexican bandit-revolutionary of that name, but has no other basis in historical fact. The film features Telly Savalas, Clint Walker, Chuck Connors and Anne Francis. Shot in Spain, this "brawling spectacle" has an often-overlooked light-comedy satirical facet, which to this day often confuses viewers. The storyline was developed during the Vietnam War and reflected certain antiwar sentiments in an American society. The title song "We All End Up the Same", with music by John Cacavas and lyrics by Don Black, is sung by Telly Savalas.

Plot
After being double-crossed in an arms deal by a gun merchant McDermott (Luis Dávila) from Columbus, New Mexico, legendary Mexican revolutionary Pancho Villa (Telly Savalas) and his American lieutenant Scotty (Clint Walker) decide to exact revenge by raiding a US Army weapons depot in Columbus and seizing McDermott. The detail-obsessed Colonel Wilcox (Chuck Conners) and his army is stationed on the American side of the border. Also on the scene is Flo (Anne Francis), Scotty’s wife, the two of them enjoy a bickering relationship.

Cast
 Telly Savalas as Pancho Villa
 Clint Walker as Scotty
 Chuck Connors as Col. Wilcox
 Anne Francis as Flo
 José María Prada as Luis
 Ángel del Pozo as Lt. Eager
 Luis Dávila as McDermott
 Mónica Randall as Lupe
 Antonio Casas as General Goyo
 Alberto Dalbés as Captain Mendoza
 Walter Coy as General Pershing

Production
Producer Bernard Gordon wrote in his autobiography that Telly Savalas and Clint Walker did not get along during the shooting of the movie. Savalas made attempts to upstage Walker and even insisted on changing some two-shots into solo shots. Conversely, Clint Walker enjoyed Anne Francis's companionship, unlike his onscreen character. This was important to Walker, as not much time had passed since he had barely survived a skiing accident, which, as he told Gordon, completely changed his life. Gordon stated that the production was finished on time and on budget despite script problems.

See also
 List of American films of 1972

References

External links
 
 
 Pancho Villa film at Hulu
 
 Pancho Villa at the Spaghetti Western Database
 

1972 films
1972 Western (genre) films
Spanish Western (genre) films
British Western (genre) films
Spaghetti Western films
English-language Spanish films
Films about Pancho Villa
Films shot in Spain
Films scored by Antón García Abril
Films directed by Eugenio Martín
1970s English-language films
American Western (genre) films
1970s American films
1970s British films
1970s Italian films